Walentynowo (German 1939-1945 Dreilinden)  is a village in the administrative district of Gmina Łobżenica, within Bydgoszcz County, Kuyavian-Pomeranian Voivodeship, in north-central Poland.

References

Walentynowo